Juniper   is an unincorporated community in Marion County, Georgia, United States.  It lies along State Route 355 on the Talbot County line, to the north of the city of Buena Vista, the county seat of Marion County.  Its elevation is 413 feet (126 m). It is part of the Columbus, Georgia Metropolitan Area.

The community takes its name from nearby Juniper Creek.

References

Unincorporated communities in Marion County, Georgia
Unincorporated communities in Georgia (U.S. state)
Columbus metropolitan area, Georgia